Andrew Douglas Rea (born September 2, 1987), also known by the pseudonym Babish, is an American YouTuber, cook, and author. He is best known for founding the YouTube channel Babish Culinary Universe and for creating and presenting its shows Binging with Babish and Basics with Babish. Rea has authored two cookbooks based on the series and has appeared as a guest in several other programs.

Early life
Rea was born September 2, 1987, in Mendon, New York, to parents Annie and Douglas Rea, and raised in Rochester, New York. He has an older brother, David, who appeared in Being With Babish. His nephew, Christopher, made an appearance in one of his videos portraying a younger version of himself. He is of Italian, Jewish, Polish, and Welsh descent. Rea's mother, who died when he was 11, taught him how to cook from a young age, including stew and cookies. As a teen, he began cooking again, and would make stews to "feel closer to her." In 2009, Rea graduated with a BA in Film Studies from Hofstra University, and later worked as a visual effects artist for SwitchFX Inc.

Career

Rea's oldest friend is middle school teacher Rashid Duroseau. Together, they created a documentary titled "Water-Proof" about restoring New Orleans in the aftermath of Hurricane Katrina.

Rea created the Binging with Babish YouTube channel on August 21, 2006 with the name inspired by The West Wing character Oliver Babish. Three videos unrelated to Binging with Babish were uploaded to the account, two in 2007 and one in 2010.

In 2016, Rea was depressed and living with a friend in Queens, New York. He decided to purchase $4000 of camera equipment with the intent of beginning to film again, but the kitchen was the only room large enough to film in the small apartment. Rea filmed himself with making a smoothie, and the tripod's placement cut off his face—which went on to be his signature filming style. He began contemplating creating an online cooking show. The first episode of Binging with Babish aired on February 10, 2016, inspired by an episode of Parks and Recreation that featured a burger cook-off. Once his channel hit 1 million subscribers, he asked his good friend Sawyer Carter Jacobs (an attorney formerly employed for Condé Nast) to become his business partner.

Rea noticed that a portion of his audience only cared about the cooking, independent of the themed content, as well as the fact that 80% of his audience were males between the ages of 18 and 35. On October 11, 2017, he uploaded the first episode of Basics With Babish, a new series dedicated to basic recipes aimed at amateur home chefs. As people cooked at home more during the COVID-19 pandemic and sought out more cooking content online, Rea's subscriber count increased from 5 million to 8 million in a few months. In response to the increased viewership, Rea increased his weekly output from one-and-a-half to two videos a week, sometimes working as many 90 hours a week. He maintained that schedule for a year-and-a-half, until he suffered from burnout. As his viewership slowed, despite his determination to reach 10 million subscribers, he fell into a depression. His viewers noticed, leaving comments to that effect on his videos, and his fiancé, Jess Opon, along with his business partner staged an intervention, encouraging him to work more realistic hours and stop "obsessing" over his engagement numbers. Heeding their advice, he returned to a one-video-a-week schedule, and began the Babish Culinary Universe, inviting other collaborators to work on the channel, including Sohla El-Waylly, Alvin Zhou, Kendall Beach and Rick Martinez.

Rea has published two cookbooks, both based upon Binging With Babish. Eat What You Watch, published in 2017 by Dovetail Communications, contains recipes from the show's first season.  Binging with Babish, published in 2019 by Houghton Mifflin Harcourt, includes 100 recipes from various seasons of the show and a foreword by Jon Favreau, of whom Rea is a fan. The book was a New York Times Best Seller.

In 2021, Rea announced on an episode of Binging With Babish that he would be launching a cookware line. Intended to be a "high quality line of products with a price point palatable for everyday chefs", the line includes Babish-branded knives, bowls, measuring spoons, and other basic kitchen tools.

Personal life
In 2014 Rea married his high school sweetheart; however, they divorced in 2017. Rea announced his engagement with Babish Culinary Universe producer Jess Opon in an Instagram post on May 13, 2021. The two were married in Binging with Babish episode 9 Million Subscriber Special by comedian and Universal Life Church-ordained minister Joel McHale.

Filmography

Online

Television

Bibliography
 Eat What You Watch: A Cookbook for Movie Lovers (2017) 
 Binging with Babish: 100 Recipes Recreated from Your Favorite Movies and TV Shows (2019)

References

External links
 About – Binging With Babish
 Andrew Rea at IMDb

People from Rochester, New York
American chefs
American YouTubers
Food and cooking YouTubers
Hofstra University alumni
The Lawrence Herbert School of Communication alumni
Chefs from New York City
1987 births
Living people